This list of rivers in the Brazilian State of Piauí is arranged by drainage basin, with respective tributaries indented under each larger stream's name and ordered from downstream to upstream. All rivers in Piauí drain to the Atlantic Ocean.

By Drainage Basin 

 Parnaíba River
 Piranji River
 Longá River
 Piracuruca River
 Dos Matos River
 Maratasã River
 Corrente River
 Poti River
 Berlengas River
 Sambito River
 São Nicolau River
 Cais River
 Capivara River
 Canindé River
 Piauí River
 Mitéuca River
 Fidalgo River
 Itaim River
 Itaueira River
 Gurguéia River
 Esfolado River
 Paraim River
 Uruçuí Prêto River
 Riozinho River
 Uruçuí-Vermelho River

Alphabetically 

 Berlengas River
 Cais River
 Canindé River
 Capivara River
 Corrente River
 Dos Matos River
 Esfolado River
 Fidalgo River
 Gurguéia River
 Itaim River
 Itaueira River
 Longá River
 Maratasã River
 Mitéuca River
 Paraim River
 Parnaíba River
 Piauí River
 Piracuruca River
 Piranji River
 Poti River
 Riozinho River
 Sambito River
 São Nicolau River
 Uruçuí Prêto River
 Uruçuí-Vermelho River

References
 Map from Ministry of Transport
 GEOnet Names Server

Rivers of Piauí
Piauí
Environment of Piauí